Kaloula rugifera, the Sichuan digging frog or Szechwan narrowmouth toad, is a species of frog in the family Microhylidae found in China.

Range
It is endemic to China where it is found in Sichuan and extreme southern Gansu.

Habitat
Its habitats are hilly areas near villages. It has also been recorded from tree-holes. Breeding takes place in temporary pools and ponds. This previously very common is believed to be declining because of habitat loss associated with infrastructure development.

Description

References

Kaloula
Amphibians of China
Endemic fauna of China
Amphibians described in 1924
Taxonomy articles created by Polbot